KHOW (630 AM) is a commercial radio station licensed to Denver, Colorado, and serving the Denver metropolitan area. The station is owned by iHeartMedia, Inc.  KHOW is one of three iHeart-owned stations in Denver with a news/talk radio format.  Co-owned KOA has mostly local shows, KDFD carries nationally syndicated programs, while KHOW airs a mix of local and syndicated hosts. Studios and offices are on South Monaco Street in Denver.

KHOW's transmitter is off East 120th Avenue in Thornton, Colorado.  It transmits with 5,000 watts and uses a directional antenna at all times.  Its signal can be easily heard from Greeley to Colorado Springs.  Programming is also heard on an HD Radio digital subchannel of co-owned KRFX 103.5 FM and on the iHeartRadio website and app.

Programming
Weekdays begin with a news and interview program hosted by former Federal Emergency Management Agency chief Michael Brown.  The rest of the weekday schedule includes "The Troubleshooter Show" with consumer advocate Tom Martino, Leland Conway and attorney Dan Caplis.  Evenings feature nationally syndicated talk shows from Joe Pags, Red Eye Radio and Our American Stories with Lee Habeeb.

Weekends feature shows on money, real estate, home repair, food, law, a public affairs show called "Front Range Focus," a political talk show with Ben Ferguson, a syndicated home improvement show with Gary Sullivan and two tech shows with Kim Komando and Leo Laporte.  Some weekend shows are paid brokered programming. Most hours begin with world and national news from ABC News Radio.

History
1925 — KFXF licensed as a new station on September 2 to the Pikes Peak Broadcasting Co., located at 226 Hangerman Building in Colorado Springs. Call sign was randomly assigned from an alphabetical roster of available call letters. William Duncan Pyle was the principal owner.
1927 —  Station moved from Colorado Springs to Denver.
1934 — Call letters changed from KFXF to KVOD ("Voice of Denver") in July.
1958 — Call letters changed from KVOD to KHOW on July 27. 
1974 — Ray Durkee began Sunday at the Memories on KHOW. In 1976 he syndicated the show nationally.
1976 — Hal Moore and Charley Martin become a morning team on KHOW. 
1978 — Alan Berg joined KHOW and became "the most popular (and most disliked) radio personality in Denver."
August 1979 — Uncomfortable with his outrageous style (e.g., insulting or hanging up on callers), KHOW management fired Berg. 
1984 — Don Martin, KHOW Sky Spy Traffic Reporter, was awarded the Broadcast Achievement Award from the Colorado Broadcasters Association. 
January 3, 1996 — The Rocky Mountain News reported that Charley Martin's contract was not renewed. 
1997 — Reggie Rivers joined KHOW.
  — Clear Channel's attempt to install an HD transmitter was thwarted by an incompatibility with the station's four-tower antenna array.

Cultural reference
The longtime morning team of "Hal & Charley" can be heard in the 1980 Stanley Kubrick film The Shining when one of the characters is attempting to reach the Overlook Hotel in Estes Park, Colorado. The station is identified as "63 KHOW" during the sequence.  A jingle from the "Class Action" package from JAM Creative Productions is also heard in scene.

History of ownership
July 1958 — The Federal Communications Commission (FCC) approved the sale of KVOD (as the station was known at the time) to Western Broadcasting Enterprises Inc., for $300,000 plus employment deal, by Colorado Radio Corp. 
1964 — KHOW was purchased by Trigg-Vaughn of Dallas.
February 3, 1967 — The FCC announced approval of the sale of the Trigg-Vaughn group of radio and TV stations to Doubleday and Company for $14,125,018.  Doubleday Broadcasting Company Inc. was formed;  Nelson Doubleday, Jr. served as chairman of this new subsidiary, and Cecil L. Trigg, who had been head of Trigg-Vaughn, continued as president and CEO. 
1981 — Metromedia Inc. bought KHOW from the Doubleday Broadcasting Company for $15 million. 
1986 — Metromedia's radio stations, including KHOW, were spun off into a separate company named Metropolitan Broadcasting. 
 April 1988 — Robert F.X. Sillerman agreed to acquire KHOW's owner, the Metropolitan Broadcasting Holding Company, for $302 million in cash and debt.
 June 1988 — Carl C. Brazell Jr. agreed to pay $20 million for two of Legacy Broadcasting's stations—KHOW and KSYY-FM—with the intent to make them part of a new entity named Command Communications Inc. Sillerman was a "major investor" in Legacy, and Carl E. Hirsch was the "controlling shareholder." 
 November 9, 1989 — Command Communications Inc. said it had agreed to sell KJOI-FM, KSYY-FM and KHOW to Viacom Broadcasting Inc. for $101.5 million. Viacom saw "high growth potential" in these properties. 
 November 9, 1992 — Variety reports that Noble Broadcast Group has agreed to acquire KHOW-AM-FM from Viacom Radio of Viacom International Inc. 
1996 — Jacor Communications purchased Noble Broadcast Group, owner of 10 stations including KHOW, for $152 million.
1999 — Clear Channel Communications, now known as iHeartMedia, purchased Jacor for $4.4 billion.

Former hosts
Claudia Lamb; Jay Marvin; Alan Berg; Hal Moore and Charley Martin; Don Wade; Bill Ashford; Harry Smith; Reggie Rivers; Scott Redmond; Peter Boyles; Ray Durkee; Lynn Woods; Michael D. Brown.

Peter Boyles left the station in June 2013 following a scuffle with his producer. Boyles' former slot was filled starting on August 19 when Mandy Connell moved from fellow iHeartMedia (then Clear Channel) station WHAS in Louisville.  Connell and Brown moved to co-owned 850 KOA.

References

External links
Official KHOW Website

FCC History Cards for KHOW (covering KFXF / KVOD / KHOW from 1927 to 1981)

News and talk radio stations in the United States
HOW
American Basketball Association flagship radio stations
Radio stations established in 1925
IHeartMedia radio stations
Metromedia